Meghana Jakkampudi (born 28 December 1995) is an Indian badminton player. She was the gold medalists at the 2019 South Asian Games in the mixed doubles and team events, also won the bronze medal in the women's doubles.

Achievements

South Asian Games 
Women's doubles

Mixed doubles

BWF International Challenge/Series (3 titles, 3 runners-up) 
Women's doubles

Mixed doubles

  BWF International Challenge tournament
  BWF International Series tournament
  BWF Future Series tournament

References

External links
 

1995 births
Living people
Racket sportspeople from Vijayawada
Sportswomen from Vijayawada, India
21st-century Indian women
21st-century Indian people
Indian female badminton players
South Asian Games gold medalists for India
South Asian Games bronze medalists for India
South Asian Games medalists in badminton